Helmut Rüffler (18 January 1918 – 21 September 2001) was a German Luftwaffe ace and recipient of the Knight's Cross of the Iron Cross during World War II.  The Knight's Cross of the Iron Cross was awarded to recognise extreme battlefield bravery or successful military leadership.  Helmut Rüffler was credited with 88 victories in 690 missions, a further 10 victories were claimed but not confirmed.

Summary of career

Aerial victory claims
According to US historian David T. Zabecki, Rüffler was credited with 88 aerial victories, while Spick lists him with 98 aerial victories. Mathews and Foreman, authors of Luftwaffe Aces — Biographies and Victory Claims, researched the German Federal Archives and state that he claimed at least 54 aerial victories, with over 50 claims on the Eastern Front and four claims over the Western Allies, including one four-engined bomber.

Awards
 Front Flying Clasp of the Luftwaffe
 Iron Cross (1939)
 2nd Class
 1st Class
 Wound Badge (1939)
 in Black
 Honour Goblet of the Luftwaffe on 19 October 1942 as Feldwebel and pilot
 German Cross in Gold on 3 December 1942 as Feldwebel in the I./Jagdgeschwader 3
 Knight's Cross of the Iron Cross on 23 December 1942 as Oberfeldwebel and pilot in the 4./Jagdgeschwader 3 "Udet"

Notes

References

Citations

Bibliography

External links
TracesOfWar.com
Aces of the Luftwaffe

1918 births
2001 deaths
Luftwaffe pilots
German World War II flying aces
Recipients of the Gold German Cross
Recipients of the Knight's Cross of the Iron Cross
People from Wałbrzych
People from the Province of Silesia